The Piano Trio No. 2 in E minor, Op. 67, is a piece for violin, cello and piano by the Russian composer Dmitri Shostakovich, started in late 1943 and completed in August the following year. It was premiered on 14 November 1944.  The piece was dedicated to his close friend Ivan Sollertinsky, whose death in February 1944 affected Shostakovich profoundly. 

The piece consists of four movements, with a complete performance running 25 to 27 minutes. The final movement, the "Dance of Death", is in particular notable for its characteristic use of Jewish scales.

History 
Shostakovich began writing the trio during the December of 1943, having earlier that year in October mentioned beginning work on a piano trio "on Russian folk themes", and having written to Isaac Glikman on 8 December he was working on the trio. Several days before completing the piece's first movement, Shostakovich's good friend Ivan Sollertinsky, a Russian polymath and avid musician, died at age 41, having experienced heart pains in the preceding days. Sollertinsky's death affected Shostakovich deeply, and he decided to dedicate the trio to his friend's memory. Upon hearing of his friend's death he wrote to Sollertinsky's widow that "it is impossible to express in words all the grief that engulfed me on hearing the news about [Sollertinsky's] death", and that "to live without him will be unbearably difficult"; in the following months he suffered from periods of depression and struggled to compose, at one point writing "it seems to me that I will never be able to compose another note again". He finished writing the work later that year, completing the second movement by 4 August 1944 and the fourth by 13 August. The work received its premiere in Leningrad on 14 November 1944, with the composer at the piano alongside Dmitri Tsyganov and Sergei Shirinsky, members of the Beethoven Quartet, who gave his Second String Quartet its premiere during the same concert.

Two years after premiering the work, in 1946, Shostakovich made the first recording of the work with Tsyganov and Shirinsky, and the next year, on 26 May 1947, he made a second recording with David Oistrakh and the Czech cellist Miloš Sádlo at the Prague Festival. In 1946, Shostakovich was also awarded a State Stalin Prize (second grade) for the trio.

Structure 
The piece consists of four movements:
 Andante — Moderato (E minor)
 Allegro con brio (F-sharp major)
 Largo (B-flat minor)
 Allegretto — Adagio (E major → E minor)

Andante — Moderato 
The first movement, in E minor, begins with a haunting passage in the cello, which plays exclusively harmonics. It is joined by the violin and then the piano, all three instruments playing in canon, with the violin entering a 13th below the cello and the piano a 13th below the violin. This slow first section of the movement undergoes development before the music moves into the faster "Moderato" section, which is in sonata form. The melodic and rhythmic features of this section's first and second themes are in essence based upon motifs introduced in the opening, and are played alongside an rhythmic "eighth-note pulsation", an accompaniment which returns in the piece's fourth movement. The movement comes to a head in the climactic recapitulation, before the music recedes in the final bars, closing quietly. Throughout the movement, G major, the relative major key, serves, in a conventional manner, as the key of the second theme of the "Moderato"; however, the keys of B-flat major and B-flat minor, a tritone from the tonic, also play a particularly notable role in the movement's modulations, with there being multiple occurrences of tonicizations from these keys. According to conductor and author Michael Mishra, this movement shows Shostakovich in a "neoclassical vein", containing melodies "almost Haydnesque in character", and with the slow introduction to a faster movement being "a nod in the direction of the Classicists".

Allegro con brio 
The second movement, in F-sharp major, is a frenzied, sardonic scherzo which moves relentlessly through dissonant figurations, never resting. The movement's trio section, in G major, is a "giddy waltz", and is less separate from the rest of the movement than is usual for Shostakovich. Sollertinsky's sister considered the movement to be "an amazingly exact portrait" of her brother, whom she said Shostakovich "understood like no one else". It also bears similarities to the scherzo movement from his Piano Quintet.

Largo 
The third movement, in B-flat minor, is a lugubrious passacaglia, based around a repeating eight-bar theme of sustained semibreve chords in the piano, tonally unstable in character. Against this background, the violin and cello, playing in canon, trade off dark, slow, and somber melodic lines. The movement ends with an attacca marking, continuing into the next movement without a pause. In 1975, after Shostakovich's death, this movement was played at his public funeral service held in the Grand Hall of the Moscow Conservatory, as thousands passed his coffin.

Allegretto — Adagio 
The piece's fourth and final movement begins in E major and transitions to E minor. Staccato repeated notes begin this "Dance of Death" movement, which introduces a Jewish-style melody, and revisits the thematic content of the previous three movements. It ends in a tortured E major chord, almost inaudibly.

The Jewish melody from this last movement was quoted in Shostakovich's String Quartet No. 8.

Ian MacDonald says in his book The New Shostakovich that the movement was inspired by the composer's horror at reports that SS guards in Nazi death camps had forced Jews to dance by their own graves.

Recordings

References

Citations

Notes

Sources

Books

Articles

Program Notes

Recordings

Further reading 
 
 

Chamber music by Dmitri Shostakovich
Shostakovich 2c
1944 compositions
Funerary and memorial compositions
Death in music
Compositions in E minor